The Japanese destroyer {{nihongo|Kuri|栗|}} was one of 21 s built for the Imperial Japanese Navy (IJN) in the late 1910s. She struck a mine off of Pusan, Korea, in October 1945 and was subsequently stricken from the naval list.

Design and description
The Momi class was designed with higher speed and better seakeeping than the preceding  second-class destroyers. Kuri was powered by two Brown-Curtis geared steam turbines, each driving one propeller shaft using steam provided by three Kampon water-tube boilers. Their crew consisted of 110 officers and crewmen.

The main armament of the Momi-class ships consisted of three  Type 3 guns in single mounts; one gun forward of the well deck, one between the two funnels, and the last gun atop the aft superstructure. The guns were numbered '1' to '3' from front to rear. The ships carried two above-water twin sets of  torpedo tubes; one mount was in the well deck between the forward superstructure and the bow gun and the other between the aft funnel and aft superstructure.

Construction and career
Kuri, built at the Kure Naval Arsenal in Hiroshima, Japan, was launched on March 19, 1920 and completed on April 30, 1920. During the Sino-Japanese War she supported the naval landing at Anqing during the Battle of Wuhan. At the start of the Pacific War she took part in the blockade of Corregidor island and Manila during the Battle of the Philippines and spent the rest of the conflict on patrol duty convoy escort. She was surrendered at Tsingtao at the end of the war, but struck a mine off of Pusan on October 8, 1945 while on minesweeping duty. The ship was officially stricken from the naval list on October 25.

Notes

References

1920 ships
Ships built by Kure Naval Arsenal
Momi-class destroyers
Ships sunk by mines